USS Myrtle has been the name of more than one United States Navy ship, and may refer to:

 , tugboat acquired in September 1862 and sold in August 1865
 , wooden lighthouse tender acquired in 1917 and returned to the United States Lighthouse Service in July 1919
 , a patrol boat in commission from 1918 to 1919
 , lighthouse and buoy tender acquired in 1939 and sold in May 1964

United States Navy ship names